The Broad Street Market, opened in 1863, is located in the Midtown neighborhood of Harrisburg, Pennsylvania in the United States. Originally established on Broad Street (now Verbeke Street) by the Verbeke family, it is today one of the oldest continuously operating farmers markets in the country.

History

On April 20, 1860, William K. Verbeke drew up papers to incorporate the West Harrisburg Market Company, in what was then considered West Harrisburg. The market is actually two separate structures. The older Stone Market house was completed in 1863 and held the name "West Harrisburg Market House". The Brick Market house was built between 1874 and 1878. From 1869, a wooden frame wing extension spanned from the Stone Building to the Capitol Street alley until its destruction in 1976-1977.

During the American Civil War, the market helped to feed the 300,000 Union soldiers who mustered through nearby Camp Curtin.

In 1979, ownership of the market was transferred to the City of Harrisburg, which operated the market until 1996 under a city-appointed agency. In 1996, the city completed a $2.5 million award-winning restoration of the Market complex, which was designed to reposition it as a successful and growth-oriented retail enterprise. In 1999, the City completed an additional $380,000 improvement to the stone market house.

It was placed on the National Register of Historic Places in 1974.

List of current vendors
The following are a current list of vendors as found on the Market's website:

See also
 National Register of Historic Places listings in Dauphin County, Pennsylvania

References

External links

Commercial buildings completed in 1863
Commercial buildings completed in 1878
Landmarks in Harrisburg, Pennsylvania
Farmers' markets in the United States
Buildings and structures in Harrisburg, Pennsylvania
Commercial buildings on the National Register of Historic Places in Pennsylvania
Historic American Buildings Survey in Pennsylvania
Tourist attractions in Harrisburg, Pennsylvania
National Register of Historic Places in Harrisburg, Pennsylvania